The fall of Berlin took place on 27 October 1806 when the Prussian capital of Berlin was captured by French forces in the aftermath of the Battle of Jena–Auerstedt. The Emperor of the French Napoleon Bonaparte entered the city, from which he issued his Berlin Decree implementing his Continental System. Large-scale plundering of Berlin took place.

Aftermath
The subsequent Battle of Eylau, the Battle of Friedland and the Treaty of Tilsit compelled Prussia to cede large portions of its territories and accept French garrisons in its major fortresses and settlements. Prussia became a client state of France, forced to pay large indemnities, and Berlin itself remained occupied until early 1813. A garrison was also established at the nearby Spandau Citadel.

Following Napoleon's Retreat from Moscow in 1812, Prussian forces serving as auxiliaries for the French switched sides and supported Russia. This combined with major uprisings across Prussian territory, forcing French troops to retreat and abandon Berlin. The city then became a major target for the French who attempted to recapture it during the German Campaign of 1813, ending only with the complete French withdrawal following the Battle of Leipzig.

Impact
Although Berlin had previously briefly been raided two times during the Seven Years' War, its occupation was a major blow to the Prussian leadership. It destroyed the reputation the Prussian Army had gained during the days of Frederick the Great. After arriving in Berlin, Napoleon visited the tomb of Frederick and is reported to have said to his marshals "Hats off gentlemen, if he were alive we wouldn’t be here today". This became an iconic scene in German culture, portrayed in Prussian films such as Old Fritz (1927) and Kolberg (1945).

In the wake of the fall of Berlin, a major reform movement was launched to restore the fighting effectiveness of the Prussian Army and renew the nation at large in order to plan a war of revenge against France. The reformed Prussian forces playing a key role in the subsequent French retreat from Germany in 1813-14, and during Napoleon's final defeat during the Waterloo Campaign in 1815.

Notes

References

Further reading

External links

Berlin 1806
History of Berlin
Military history of Berlin
Berlin 1806
Berlin 1806
1806 in Germany
Berlin